Terminaator is an Estonian rock group formed in 1987 by Arno Veimer and Jaagup Kreem in Tallinn 10. High School (today known as Nõmme Gymnasium). Kreem was in the 7th grade then. The first public performance was in Tallinn 47. High School in the schoolbands' festival. The first time in the studio was in 1989. First songs "Charleen" and "Meeletu maailm" were recorded in 1991. They found wider fame in 1992, when they won the festival of young bands Rock In. They have also performed in Latvia, Lithuania and Finland, although they have not had much success outside of Estonia. On the Estonian television show "7 vaprat", Terminaator have appeared playing their songs "Ainult sina võid mu maailma muuta", "Juulikuu lumi", "See ei ole saladus", and "Portselanist tüdruk".

2005–2008
2005 saw the release of the band's first live album, Go Live 2005, which was followed in 2006 by Terminaator's 7th studio album Nagu esimene kord. In the same year, Terminaator participated in a musical rendition of Romeo & Julia, which was accompanied by a soundtrack.

In 2007, a traditional anniversary best-of album was released, titled 20, which included two new versions of older songs, two new songs and unreleased live recordings among others. Also, the first proper video was made for "Juulikuu lumi 2007". The second single released was "Ära oota koidikuni".

In 2008, two non-album singles, "Oh kuidas sust puudust tunneme" and "Pilves selgimistega", were released. This is the first time that the band had released songs not featured on any albums (however, it is yet uncertain, if they will be included to the next studio album, due in 2010).

In November 2008, Terminaator did three acoustic concerts, of which one will see a release on CD and DVD in 2009.

2009–

On 13 March 2009, Elmar Liitmaa and Harmo Kallaste announced their departure from the band. The reasons given were lack of time and new challenges. Since then, negotiations are being held with the former guitarist of Brides in Bloom, Taavi Langi. According to the band's website, recording of new material started in the end of March and the first single from the upcoming studio album was to be released in April.

The new single, "Just reedeti", debuted on Raadio 2 on 14 May 2009, featuring Taavi Langi on guitar.

The album, Rakett (Rocket), was released on 13 April 2011.

Members 
 Jaagup Kreem – vocals, guitar
 Henno Kelp – bass guitar (since 2003)
 Roland Puusepp – drums (since 2003)
 Taavi Langi – guitar (since 2009)

Former members 
 Margus Paalamaa (1987–1988) – bass
 Tiit Must (1987–1989) – drums
 Arno "Arch" Veimer (1987–1995) – guitar
 Andres Toome (1989–1992) – bass
 Sulev "Sulliwan" Müürsepp (1990–1992; 1996–1998) – guitar
 Raimond "My" Vather (1990–1991) – drums
 Andres Oja (1991) – drums
 Eimel Kaljulaid (1991–2003) – drums
 Indrek Timmer (1992–1995) – bass
 Sven Valdmann (1995–2003) – bass
 Margus Valk (1997–1998) – guitar
 Elmar Liitmaa (1992–1996; 1999–2009) – electric guitar, backing vocals
 Harmo Kallaste (1996; 2000–2009) – keyboards, backing vocals

Only on concerts 
 Antz (1991) – drums
 Tõnu Väärtnõu (1998) – keyboards
 Jüri Roosa (2000) – bass
 Raul Vaigla (2003) – bass

Awards 
 Golden Disc – 1998, 2 awards; best band of the year and album of the year
 Music awards – 2001, audience's favourite; 2003, Stiina's favourite
 Raadio 2–1995 & 2002, the first Estonian band to win the first place 2 times in the end of the year chart

Discography 
 1994: Lõputu päev
 1995: Minu väike paradiis
 1997: Pühertoonia
 1997: Kuld
 1998: Singapur
 2000: Head uudised
 2001: Risk
 2003: Kuutõbine
 2005: Go Live 2005
 2006: Nagu esimene kord
 2006: Romeo & Julia (not released under the name of Terminaator)
 2007: 20
 2009: Ingli puudutus
 2011: Rakett
 2014: Vaikuse meri
 2020: Maailm vs. Lilian

References

External links 

Terminaator at Estmusic.com

Estonian rock music groups
Estonian hard rock musical groups
Estonian punk rock groups
Musical groups established in 1987
1987 establishments in Estonia